"Feel the Spin" is a 1985 song by the American vocalist Debbie Harry, featured on the soundtrack album for the film Krush Groove (1985). The song was co-written by Harry and producers John "Jellybean" Benitez and Toni C. (the latter of whom would go on to collaborate with Harry again on many of her solo albums). Both producers went on to work with Whitney Houston on her 1988 hit "Love Will Save the Day", from her album Whitney.

"Feel the Spin" was released as an extended 12" single on Warner Bros. Records / Geffen Records in the U.S. (where it charted on the Hot Dance Music/Maxi-Singles Sales chart at #5). It was also released as a single in Canada, but not in the UK (though the track would surface in 1987 as the B-side of the UK singles "Free to Fall" and "In Love With Love.

The extended dance version of "Feel the Spin" was included on both the 1988 Blondie/Debbie Harry remix compilation Once More into the Bleach as well as Harry's 1999 greatest hits compilation Most of All - The Best of Deborah Harry.

On the entry for October 24th, 1985 of the Andy Warhol Diaries, he recalls that he:Cabbed to the Palladium for Debbie Harry’s party ($6) for her song that Jellybean produced, “Feel the Spin.” When Debbie arrived, she saw us in the balcony and came up there because she thought it was the place to (laughs) be, and then it was the place to be because all the photographers came after her. She looks great. Debbie actually was the first Madonna.

Track listing
US 12-inch single
"Feel the Spin" (Extended Dance Version) – 6:50
"Feel the Spin" (Dub Version) – 4:34

Charts

Weekly charts

Year-end charts

References

1985 singles
1985 songs
Debbie Harry songs
Geffen Records singles
Songs written by Debbie Harry